The 1570 Siege of Malta, written in the immediate aftermath of the events by the Cretan writer Antonios Achelis, is a classic of Cretan Greek literature.
Christopher Marlowe's The Jew of Malta (1589–90) takes some inspiration from the siege
Walter Scott's novel The Siege of Malta, written in 1831-1832 shortly before his death, was not published until 2008.

Modern authors have attempted to capture the desperation and ferocity of the siege, with varying degrees of success.

 The Great Siege, Malta 1565, Ernle Bradford (1961)
Dorothy Dunnett in "The Disorderly Knights" (1966), the third volume of The "Lymond Chronicles", gives a detailed fiction account of the events of 1551 in Malta, Gozo and Tripoli. Although several of the characters are fictional, the bulk of the personages are historical.
 The novel Ironfire: An Epic Novel of Love and War (2003) by David W. Ball is the story of kidnapping, slavery and revenge leading up to the siege of Malta. It takes a somewhat less sympathetic view of the Catholic Knights Hospitaller and maintains a more romantic approach. (The British edition is called "The Sword and the Scimitar.")
Angels in Iron (2004) by Nicholas Prata remains faithful to the historical narrative and tells the story from a distinctly Catholic point of view.
 The novel The Religion (2006) by Tim Willocks tells the story of the siege through the eyes of a fictional mercenary called Mattias Tannhauser, who is on Malta fighting (at times) alongside the Knights (referred to primarily as The Religion), while trying to locate the bastard son of a Maltese noblewoman.  In this attempt his opponent is a high-ranking member of the Inquisition. The story presents a picture of both sides of the conflict without romanticising or sanitising the content for modern consumption.
 It is the main plot of Pirates of Christ (2007), the historical novel by Edward Lamond.
Roger Crowley's Empires of The Sea (2008) has a lengthy section on the siege of Malta.
The novel Blood Rock (2008) by James Jackson tells the story of the siege with a focus on a fictional English mercenary called Christian Hardy. Throughout the siege, Hardy works to discover the identity of the traitor within The Religion who works to ensure a Moslem victory. The traitor works on behalf of the French king, Francis I, who believed that peace with the Ottoman Empire was in the French interest and that the marauding Knights Hospitaller, by annoying the Sultan, threatened the security of France.
In the video game Age of Empires III, released in 2005, the story-based campaign mode has a fictional account of the siege of Malta. The Maltese used Hoop Throwers that throw flaming hoops at Janissaries.
Clash Of Empires: The Great Siege (2011), a novel written by Christopher Hart, under the pen name William Napier, focuses on how the events of 1565 effected Nicholas Ingoldsby, a fictional English character, and  the son of one of the Knights of St. John.
Eight-Pointed Cross (2011) by Marthese Fenech remains faithful to historical events and tells the story from the perspectives of a Maltese family and an Ottoman family. The narrative culminates with Dragut's 1551 raid of Gozo. Work on the sequel, which focuses on the Siege of 1565, is currently underway.
 The novel The sword and the scimitar (2012), by Simon Scarrow, is set around the Siege of Malta, and recounts events through the eyes of the disgraced veteran Knight Sir Thomas Barrett (a fictional character),  who is secretly searching for a hidden scroll that is in the possession of the Knights of St. John, that could threaten the reign of his Queen, Elizabeth I.
 The novel The Course of Fortune (J. Boylston, 2015), by Tony Rothman, published in three volumes, recounts the events leading up to the Siege of Malta beginning with the 1551 raid on Gozo, in which the corsair Turgut Reis (Dragut) enslaved the island's entire population.  The story is told through the eyes of a young Spanish mercenary and relies heavily on early and original sources.

References

Siege of Malta
Malta in fiction
Fiction set in the 1560s